Raury Deshawn Tullis (born June 10, 1996) is an American singer-songwriter and rapper from Atlanta, Georgia. He is known for his eclectic sound mixing soul, hip hop and folk. He was born and raised in Stone Mountain, Georgia. He was also a member to the C5 Georgia Youth Foundation.

Raury released his debut mixtape Indigo Child, on August 25, 2014. The mixtape reached many ears and the success of his mixtape led to a record deal with Columbia Records.

Early life 
Raury Deshawn Tullis was born on June 10, 1996, in Stone Mountain, Georgia. It was at age fourteen when Raury decided that he wanted to work with music for the rest of his life. When he was fifteen he started to record and produce music in his friends basement. At that time he was writing songs and putting together projects, but he was too shy to put it out there. Influenced by 2Pac, a lot of his early music was sad, aggressive, and about love. His music told stories and he used music as a tool to express himself. In high school, Raury played guitar in a cover band. In 2014, the year Raury graduated, he threw a music festival called Raurfest on his 18th birthday. He then issued a free digital download of his mixtape Indigo Child, and led him to his popularity.

Career

2014–present 
On August 25, 2014, Raury released his first mixtape, titled Indigo Child. On the same year, he announced that he signed a deal with Columbia Records. In 2014, he was shortlisted for the BBC's Sound of 2015. In 2014, New Zealand singer Lorde invited Raury to contribute his vocals on the song "Lost Souls", which was included on the soundtrack for The Hunger Games: Mockingjay Part 1. In January 2015, he was placed at number 4 on the list for the BBC's Sound of 2015. In 2015, Raury was featured on the cover of XXL magazine for the 2015 Freshman Class. On October 16, 2015, Raury released his debut studio album, titled All We Need. His song, called "Crystal Express" (which was taken from his album All We Need) appeared on the video game FIFA 16. "Devils Whisper" (which also was taken from his album All We Need) was used for the trailer of the popular Coronation Street storyline. In 2016, Raury went on tour as a support act for the rapper Macklemore. On September 15, 2016, Raury released a single called "Butterfly". The song "God's Whisper" appears in the motion pictures American Honey, Lucy, Collide, and the Netflix series Dark. The song "Devil's Whisper" appeared in the film Logan. On November 17, 2017, Raury appeared on Jaden Smith's album Syre, in the song "Falcon". As of 2018, it has been confirmed that Raury is no longer signed by the Columbia Records label. In an interview conducted by DJ Booth Raury stated that, "I went to Coachella without any support from the label. It was like they were trying to put me in a position of fear and weakness so I could run out of money and they could control me". On February 17, 2018, Raury released his latest single called "Odyssey" on his SoundCloud.

On April 20, 2018, Raury released a project titled The Woods for free.

In 2019, Raury released a self produced album titled Fervent under his record company "Into the Woods". He released a project titled Strawberry Moon under said record company on June 14, 2022.

Artistry
Raury is known for his eclectic sound mixing soul, hip hop and folk. He has stated that he is influenced by André 3000, Kid Cudi, Kanye West, Bon Iver, Queen, Fleet Foxes, Marvin Gaye, and Father John Misty.

Discography

Studio albums

Mixtapes

Singles

As lead artist

As featured artist

Guest appearances

References

Living people
1996 births
Musicians from Atlanta
People from Stone Mountain, Georgia
African-American male singer-songwriters
21st-century African-American male singers
Singer-songwriters from Georgia (U.S. state)